Nikolai Karotamm (October 23, 1901 – September 21, 1969) was an Estonian communist politician. He was a member of the Communist Party of Estonia.  In 1925, he emigrated to the Netherlands, where in 1926, he joined the Communist Party of the Netherlands.
Following the Second World War, he led multiple repatriation teams to displaced persons camps in Germany.

Biography 
Nikolai Karotamm was born in the family of a carpenter and served in the Guard Battalion in 1921. 

In 1925 he moved to the Nederlands and joined the Communist Party of Netherlands. In 1926 he settled in the USSR and studied at the Communist University of the National Minorities of the West. In 1928 Karotamm became a member of the All-Union Communist Party (b) and in the same year was sent to Estonia to reestablish the Estonian Communist Party.   

In 1929 he returned to the Soviet Union and graduated from the univerty and later became a lecturer at the university. He also worked as an active agent of the Executive Committee of the Comintern. He was arrested during the Great Purge in 1938 but was soon released without charges.   

During the annexation of Estonia by the Soviet Union, Karotamm arrived in Estonia in July 1940 and worked as the editor-in-chief of the newspaper Kommunist from July to August 1940. After the June coup, he was appointed the first secretary of the Tartu City Committee in of the ECP (b) 1941.   

In August 1941 he was elected Second Secretary of the Central Committee of the ECB , and from 1940 to 1951 he was a member of the Bureau of the Central Committee of the EC (b) P and the Central Committee of the EC (b) P.

Upon the invasion of Nazi Germany and the subsequent occupation of Baltic states, Karotamm became a member of the Republican Defense Committee of the Estonian SSR. After the Soviet government became aware of the arrest of Karl Säre by the German invaders, Karotamm became the acting leader of the Communist Party of Estonia after he fled to Leningrad.     

In 1944 he returned to Estonia and was officially elected as the First Secretary of the Communist Party of Estonia and was simultaneously First Secretary of the Tallinn City Committee of the ECP (b).         

In 1949 he was relieved from his positions and subsequently expelled from the party due to alleged "inappropriate leniency and negligence and the concealment of bourgeois nationalists". He then settled in Moscow and studied in the Academy of Social Sciences under the Central Committee of the CPSU and later worked at the Institute of Economics of the Soviet Academy of Sciences. He received his doctorate of economics in 1964.           

Due to his disagreements with his successor Johannes Käbin, Karotamm never returned to Estonia. He died in Moscow and was buried at the Metsakalmistu cemetery.

References

Bibliography
Voldemar Pinn, Kes oli Nikolai Karotamm? I. Kultuuritragöödia jälgedes: kompartei kolmest esimesest sekretärist Karl Särest, Nikolai Karotammest, Johannes Käbinist. Haapsalu 1996
Voldemar Pinn, Kes oli Nikolai Karotamm? II Langi Kolla kroonika. Pärnu 1997?

External links
 Eesti biograafiline andmebaas ISIK. KAROTAMM, Nikolai
 БИОГРАФИЧЕСКИЙ УКАЗАТЕЛЬ. Каротамм Николай Георгиевич

1901 births
1969 deaths
People from Pärnu
People from Kreis Pernau
Heads of the Communist Party of Estonia
Members of the Supreme Soviet of the Estonian Soviet Socialist Republic, 1947–1951
Second convocation members of the Soviet of the Union
Third convocation members of the Soviet of the Union
Recipients of the Order of Lenin